Rui Pinto de Andrade (born 23 September 1999) is an Angolan-Portuguese racing driver who is currently racing in the IMSA Michelin Endurance Cup with Tower Motorsport and the FIA World Endurance Championship for WRT Team.

Single-seater career

Spanish F4 Championship
Andrade's first experience in single-seaters came in 2018, where he competed for Drivex in the F4 Spanish Championship. He competed from the second round in Valencia until the end of the season, finishing 12th in the standings, having achieved his best results at Barcelona and Navarra where he finished 5th respectively.

Formula 4 UAE Championship

Andrade drove for Emirate team Dragon Racing in the 2019 Formula 4 UAE Championship. With 201 points Andrade attained 5th in the standings while standing on the podium 6 times, none of which were wins however two of them were second places. The two second places came at the first race at Dubai Autodrome and second race at Yas Marina Circuit.

Toyota Racing Series

At the 2020 Toyota Racing Series Andrade raced for M2 Competition alongside the top two driver in the championship, Igor Fraga and Liam Lawson. Andrade won 70 points over the course of the season meaning he finished 16th, 2 points behind French teammate Émilien Denner. Two 9th places were the Angolan's best results at the first 2 races at Pukekohe Park.

Euroformula Open Championship
Andrade's first season at the Euroformula Open Championship was in 2019 with Spanish outfit Drivex Racing. Andrade only finished in the points once and it was at the last round in Monza, ultimately this contributed to a 22nd-place finish with 6 points.

In 2020 Andrade switched to CryptoTower Racing, driving alongside Ye Yifei. Whilst the Angolan improved compared to the previous year, scoring points in the majority of races, he ended up 14th in the standings.

Endurance Racing

2021: ALMS, ELMS and Le Mans debut 
For 2021, Andrade made the transition to sportscars, signing up to compete in the Asian and European Le Mans Series with G-Drive Racing. The former championship would yield major success, as Andrade and his teammates, John Falb and Franco Colapinto scored three podiums, leading the team to finish third in the standings. Meanwhile, their European efforts were just as successful, with six class podiums out of six race starts, including an overall podium at the Red Bull Ring.and won the Pro-Am title alongside Falb. That year, Andrade also took part at the 24 Hours of Le Mans, where he was forced to retire following an accident.

2022: WEC and first victory 
The following season, the Angolan competed in the World Endurance Championship on a full-time basis, partnering Ferdinand Habsburg and Norman Nato at RealTeam by WRT. Having taken two podiums in the opening two races, the outfit experienced a disappointing Le Mans, finishing 17th in class. That result was quickly forgotten, with Andrade and his teammates taking victory at the 6 Hours of Monza, thus making Andrade the first Angolan to win an FIA-sanctioned World Championship race. A pair of top-five finishes ended their season, with the team ending up fourth in the championship.

2023: Return to WRT 
Andrade returned to Team WRT for the 2023 WEC season, where he would be driving alongside former Prema teammates Louis Delétraz and Robert Kubica.

Racing record

Career summary

† As Andrade was a guest driver, he was ineligible for championship points.
* Season still in progress.

Complete F4 Spanish Championship results 
(key) (Races in bold indicate pole position) (Races in italics indicate fastest lap)

Complete Formula 4 UAE Championship results 
(key) (Races in bold indicate pole position; races in italics indicate fastest lap)

Complete Euroformula Open Championship results 
(key) (Races in bold indicate pole position) (Races in italics indicate fastest lap)

Complete Toyota Racing Series results 
(key) (Races in bold indicate pole position) (Races in italics indicate fastest lap)

Complete Asian Le Mans Series results 
(key) (Races in bold indicate pole position) (Races in italics indicate fastest lap)

Complete European Le Mans Series results
(key) (Races in bold indicate pole position; results in italics indicate fastest lap)

Complete 24 Hours of Le Mans results

Complete IMSA SportsCar Championship results
(key) (Races in bold indicate pole position; results in italics indicate fastest lap)

† Points only counted towards the Michelin Endurance Cup, and not the overall LMP2 Championship.
* Season still in progress.

Complete FIA World Endurance Championship results
(key) (Races in bold indicate pole position; races in italics indicate fastest lap)

† As Andrade was a guest driver, he was ineligible for championship points.
* Season still in progress.

References

External links
 

1999 births
Living people
Angolan racing drivers
Spanish F4 Championship drivers
Formula Renault Eurocup drivers
Euroformula Open Championship drivers
Formula Ford drivers
Toyota Racing Series drivers
European Le Mans Series drivers
Asian Le Mans Series drivers
FIA World Endurance Championship drivers
24 Hours of Le Mans drivers
Portuguese racing drivers
WeatherTech SportsCar Championship drivers
Drivex drivers
FA Racing drivers
M2 Competition drivers
Motopark Academy drivers
G-Drive Racing drivers
W Racing Team drivers
Starworks Motorsport drivers
Portuguese people of Angolan descent
UAE F4 Championship drivers